The 2017 Türk Telecom İzmir Cup was a professional tennis tournament played on hard courts. It was the tenth edition of the tournament which was part of the 2017 ATP Challenger Tour. It took place in İzmir, Turkey between 18 and 24 September 2017.

Singles main-draw entrants

Seeds

 1 Rankings are as of 11 September 2017.

Other entrants
The following players received wildcards into the singles main draw:
  Sarp Ağabigün
  Altuğ Çelikbilek
  Muhammet Haylaz
  Anıl Yüksel

The following players received entry into the singles main draw as special exempts:
  Matteo Berrettini
  Alexander Bublik

The following players received entry from the qualifying draw:
  Yannick Jankovits
  Robin Kern
  Lucas Miedler
  Marc Sieber

The following player received entry as a lucky loser:
  Mikalai Haliak

Champions

Singles

 Illya Marchenko def.  Stéphane Robert 7–6(7–2), 6–0.

Doubles

 Scott Clayton /  Jonny O'Mara def.  Denys Molchanov /  Sergiy Stakhovsky Walkover.

External links
Official Website

Türk Telecom İzmir Cup
2017 in Turkish tennis
September 2017 sports events in Turkey